Torquay is a village in the Canadian province of Saskatchewan within the Rural Municipality of Cambria No. 6 and Census Division No. 2. It was named after Torquay in Devon, England.

History 
Torquay was established in 1912 when the land was sold to the Canadian Pacific Railway for $2,400. At the suggestion of a railroad superintendent's wife, the area was named after the English town of Torquay as like its namesake, it had an abundant water supply. The Ambrose-Torquay Border Crossing that connects Torquay with the North Dakota village of Ambrose opened in 1915 and remains in daily use today.

Politician Elmer Knutson, founder of the Confederations of Regions Party, was born on his family's farm in Torquay in 1914.

Torquay incorporated as a village on December 11, 1923. The first council meeting as the Village of Torquay was held on January 9, 1924.

In May 2018 the Canadian government announced plans to construct the country's first geothermal power plant in the area, with the eventual aim of using renewable energy to power hundreds of thousands of homes in Saskatchewan.

Demographics 

See also 
List of villages in Saskatchewan
List of communities in Saskatchewan

References

External links 

Villages in Saskatchewan
Cambria No. 6, Saskatchewan
Division No. 2, Saskatchewan